Michael Toshiyuki Uno is an American film and television director, credited with directing television programs such as Alfred Hitchcock Presents (the remake series that began in 1985), China Beach, The Outsiders, Early Edition, and Dawson's Creek.

Biography
Uno has also directed the films The Silence, The Wash, and Dangerous Intentions.

Uno was nominated with Joseph Benson for an Academy Award for Best Live Action Short Film in 1982 for The Silence.

In January 2008, Michael Uno played a Kung-Fu master in a William Shatner Priceline commercial.

External links

American film directors of Japanese descent
American television directors
Living people
Place of birth missing (living people)
Year of birth missing (living people)